Wilseyville is an unincorporated community in Calaveras County, California. It lies at an elevation of 2769 feet (844 m). Wilseyville's post office was established in 1947; it has the zip code 95257. Wilseyville was named after Lawrence A. Wilsey, an executive at the American Forest Products Company.

Wilseyville is notorious for being the location of the cabin where serial killers Leonard Lake and Charles Ng killed and disposed of some of their victims. Their spree ended in June 1985, when Ng was spotted loading stolen merchandise into a car driven by Lake in South San Francisco. Ng fled, but Lake was arrested at the scene for illegally outfitting a .22 caliber pistol with a silencer. He swallowed a cyanide pill while in police custody and died four days later. Police found human remains and other evidence at the Wilseyville cabin and began a manhunt for Ng. He was arrested in Canada for shoplifting and was extradited to the United States after serving a sentence in Canada. Ng was sentenced to death after being found guilty on 11 of 12 counts of murder. It was later ruled that Lake and Ng were responsible for the 12th victim, though they are thought to have killed as many as 25 people.

Climate
Area has a Köppen Climate Classification of Csb, which is a dry-summer subtropical climate often referred to as "Mediterranean".

References

External links

Unincorporated communities in California
Unincorporated communities in Calaveras County, California